Ladislaus von Rabcewicz (June 12, 1893 in St. Kunigund, nearby Maribor – December 19, 1975) was an Austrian engineer and university professor at the Vienna University of Technology.  He is notable for being one of three men who developed the New Austrian Tunneling method.

He lived in Iran along with his family to build Veresk Bridge in Savadkooh, Mazandaran.

Awards
Wilhelm Exner Medal in 1975.

References

1893 births
1975 deaths
20th-century Austrian people
Austrian civil engineers
Austrian untitled nobility
Austrian people of Polish descent
People from Maribor